Wannebach is a small river of North Rhine-Westphalia, Germany. It is right tributary of the Ruhr. Its source is near Dortmund-Syburg, north of the Hengsteysee. It joins the Ruhr near Schwerte-Westhofen, about 900 m downstream from the other Wannebach.

See also
List of rivers of North Rhine-Westphalia

References

Rivers of North Rhine-Westphalia
Rivers of Germany